The 2012–13 Cal State Northridge Matadors men's basketball team represented California State University, Northridge during the 2012–13 NCAA Division I men's basketball season. The Matadors, led by 17th year head coach Bobby Braswell, played their home games at the Matadome and were members of the Big West Conference. They finished the season 14–17, 5–13 in Big West play to finish in ninth place. They failed to qualify for the Big West tournament.

Roster

Schedule

|-
!colspan=9| Exhibition

|-
!colspan=9| Regular season

References

Cal State Northridge Matadors men's basketball seasons
Cal State Northridge